Roamin' Wild is a 1936 American Western film directed by Bernard B. Ray and starring Tom Tyler and Max Davidson. It was produced and released by the independent Reliable Pictures.

Synopsis
Traveling peddler Abe Wineman (Max Davidson) is robbed by outlaws. Roaming cowboy Tom Barton (Tom Tyler) intercedes by routing the gang and rescuing Abe. The grateful Abe becomes Tom's sidekick. They arrive in Placerville, where Tom's brother is the marshal. Tom finds a phony lawman in his brother's place. Local badman Clark (Al Ferguson) is behind all the trouble, and his next target is the Madison stage line. Tom joins Mary Madison (Carol Wyndham) to battle Clark while looking for his missing brother.

Cast 
Tom Tyler as Tom Barton
Max Davidson as Abe Wineman
Carol Wyndham as Mary Madison
Al Ferguson as Clark
George Chesebro as Henchman Tip
Fred Parker as Dad Summers
Slim Whitaker as Marshal Lucas
Bud Osborne as Henchman Red
Wally West as Jim Barton
Earl Dwire as Jim Madison
Lafe McKee as 'Dad' Parker
John Elliott as Chief Inspector Reed

References

External links 

1936 films
American black-and-white films
1936 Western (genre) films
American Western (genre) films
Reliable Pictures films
Films directed by Bernard B. Ray
1930s English-language films
1930s American films